Rajeshwari Ria Kumari (born 10 December 1991) is an Indian sports shooter and fashion designer. Kumari is a trap shooter and has won medals in both domestic and international competitions. She is a co-founder of Saurab Rajeshwari, a luxury Indian clothing and embroidery brand.

Early life and background 
Rajeshwari Ria Kumari was born on 10 December 1991 in Delhi, India. Kumari is the daughter of sports administrator, Randhir Singh and Vinita Singh. Her mother, Vinita, is a businesswoman. She is a granddaughter of sports administrator, Bhalindra Singh. Kumari is the maternal granddaughter of business magnate, Vipin Khanna and a member of the Khanna family through her mother, Vinita. She is also the great-granddaughter of Maharaja Bhupinder Singh of Patiala.

Kumari attended university at Manav Rachna International Institute of Research and Studies.

Shooting career 
Kumari started her trap shooting career sometime before 2014. In November 2014, She won a bronze medal at the National Shotgun Championship in Patiala, Punjab, beating Shreyasi Singh for the medal. In February 2015, she won a silver medal at the National Shooting Championships, which was held in New Delhi, India. During the 63rd National Shotgun Shooting Championship in 2019, Kumari shot a national record 118 out of 125 in the qualifications, and eventually won a silver medal. In 2021, she won a gold medal at the Asian Online Shooting Championship in New Delhi. Also in 2021, she won a silver medal in the team trap event at the 2021 ISSF World Cup in Cairo, Egypt, and was in a team with Kirti Gupta and Manisha Keer. 

At the National Shooting Championships in 2022, Kumari shot the highest score in the qualification round, shooting 116 out of 125, however she lost in the semifinals of the competition. In March 2023, during the Shotgun World Cup in Doha, Qatar, Kumari shot a score of 107 and came 46th.

Fashion career 
In 2021, Kumari co-founded Saurab Rajeshwari, a luxury Indian clothing and embroidery brand that is based on traditional Patiala style, with Saurabh Aggarwal, her childhood friend. Saurab Rajeshwari's clothes are handmade. The brand's clothing has been worn by Bollywood actress, Preity Zinta. In December 2022, Kumari was featured on Jasbir Jassi's song, 'Lehenga', and the song was also a collaboration between Jassi and Saurab Rajeshwari.

Personal life 
Kumari is married to Mehtab Singh. She and Singh married in 2013.

References

1991 births
Indian female sport shooters
Indian women fashion designers
Living people
Indian Sikhs
Khanna family